Nabajug was a Bengali-language daily newspaper published from 1920 to 1944.

History 
The newspaper was founded in Kolkata on 12 July 1920 by A. K. Fazlul Huq. The first editors were Kazi Nazrul Islam and Muzaffar Ahmed. The newspaper opposed the appointment of Nirmalabala Shome to the education service when male applicants were available.

References 

1920 establishments in India
Bengali-language newspapers published in India
Bengali-language newspapers
Defunct newspapers published in India
Newspapers published in Kolkata
Publications established in 1920